Mad Dogs is a British television serial, written by Cris Cole. The series premiered in the United Kingdom on 10 February 2011 on Sky1 with a four-part first series. Series two and three also contained four parts each, broadcasting in early 2012 and June 2013 respectively. It concluded with a two-part fourth and final series on 28 and 29 December 2013. Mad Dogs follows four lifelong friends, Baxter (John Simm), Quinn (Philip Glenister), Rick (Marc Warren) and Woody (Max Beesley), who spend a week in Majorca to celebrate the early retirement of Alvo (Ben Chaplin), another friend. However, as time goes by the friends become embroiled in the world of crime and police corruption after Alvo is murdered.

Series overview

Episodes

Series 1 (2011)

Series 2 (2012)

Series 3 (2013)

Series 4 (2013)

Notes

References

Lists of British drama television series episodes